Lūsis is a Latvian surname.

Notable people with this surname include:
 Gunārs Lūsis (born 1950), Latvian artist
 Helvijs Lūsis (born 1987), Latvian bobsledder
 Jānis Lūsis (1939–2020), Latvian athlete
 Voldemārs Lūsis (born 1974), Latvian athlete

See also 

 Lusis a 1992 album by Christian industrial band Mortal